Hugo Duro Perales (born 10 November 1999) is a Spanish professional footballer who plays as a striker for La Liga club Valencia.

Club career

Getafe
Born in Getafe, Madrid, Duro joined Getafe CF's youth setup in 2004, aged five. On 24 October 2017, before even appearing with the reserves, he made his professional debut by coming on as a second-half substitute for Chuli in a 1–0 home loss against Deportivo Alavés, for the season's Copa del Rey.

Duro first appeared with the B-side on 29 October 2017, replacing Carlos Calderón in a 2–1 Tercera División away win against CD El Álamo. He scored his first senior goals on 19 November, netting a brace in a 3–0 home win against DAV Santa Ana.

On 17 March 2018, Duro made his La Liga debut in a 2–1 win at Real Sociedad, as a last-minute replacement for Jorge Molina. The following 29 January, in the cup quarter-finals against Valencia CF, he accidentally blocked a goal-bound shot by Molina as Getafe led on away goals in added time; twelve seconds after the ball ricocheted off his back, opponent Rodrigo scored the winning goal. Valencia's fans and players then turned the television commentary "Tocó en Hugo Duro" (It hit Hugo Duro) into a motto as they went on to win the cup, receiving a complaint from the player's agent.

Duro scored his first goal in the division on 8 July 2020, coming off the bench to equalise in a 3–1 home loss to Villarreal CF. The following month, he signed for Real Madrid on a season-long loan deal with option to buy, being initially assigned to the reserves in Segunda División B. He made his first-team debut for Los Blancos on 20 February, in a 1–0 away win over Real Valladolid, and he first appeared in the UEFA Champions League four days later, as he replaced Marco Asensio in a 1–0 victory over Atalanta B.C. at the Stadio Atleti Azzurri d'Italia. Real were refused permission to loan him for a second season and could not meet the €4 million offer to make the deal permanent.

Valencia
On 31 August 2021, Duro moved to fellow first division side Valencia CF on a one-year loan deal, reuniting with former Getafe manager José Bordalás. He made his debut on 12 September in a 4–1 win at CA Osasuna, as a half-time replacement for defender José Gayà. A week later, he scored his first goal to open a 2–1 loss to Real Madrid at the Mestalla Stadium; he totalled seven in his first league campaign, including two added-time goals to gain a 3–3 draw at home to Atlético Madrid on 7 November. On 31 December, he was sent off in a 2–1 loss to visitors RCD Espanyol.

In the 2021–22 Copa del Rey, Duro scored the winner in a 2–1 quarter-final win against Cádiz CF on 2 February 2022, and the equaliser in the first leg of the semi-final against Athletic Bilbao eight days later. In the final on 23 April, he netted Valencia's goal in the 1–1 draw, being replaced by Bryan Gil with five minutes of regulation time remaining in an eventual penalty shootout defeat to Real Betis.

In May 2022, Duro's loan was made permanent on a four-year deal for a fee of €4 million.

Career statistics

Club

References

External links
Valencia profile

1999 births
Living people
People from Getafe
Spanish footballers
Footballers from the Community of Madrid
Association football forwards
Spain under-21 international footballers
La Liga players
Segunda División B players
Tercera División players
Getafe CF footballers
Getafe CF B players
Real Madrid Castilla footballers
Real Madrid CF players
Valencia CF players